Făt Frumos was a semimonthly literary magazine published in Bârlad, Romania. Covering political, economic and literary topics, was first printed on 15 March 1904 at the C. D. Lupaşcu printing shop. The chief editors were George Tutoveanu and D. Nanu, and, at a later date Corneliu Moldovanu and Anastasie Mândru. The last issue of the magazine was printed on 1 February 1906. From 1 March 1909 to 1 April 1909 it was edited by writer Emil Gârleanu.

Făt Frumos was an important presence on Romania's literary scene, publishing contributions by known writers such as Mihail Sadoveanu, Nicolae Iorga, Eugen Lovinescu, Gheorghe Vâlsan, Arthur Gorovei, Dimitrie Anghel, Elena Farago and Ilarie Chendi.

Defunct literary magazines published in Europe
Defunct magazines published in Romania
Magazines established in 1904
Magazines disestablished in 1909
Mass media in Bârlad
Romanian-language magazines
Literary magazines published in Romania
Semimonthly magazines